The Block Brochure: Welcome to the Soil 2 is the sixteenth studio album by American rapper E-40. The album is part of a trilogy that was released on March 26, 2012. The other albums in the trilogy include The Block Brochure: Welcome to the Soil 1, and The Block Brochure: Welcome to the Soil 3. E-40's last four albums were released in pairs; Revenue Retrievin': Day Shift and Revenue Retrievin': Night Shift were released in 2010, and Revenue Retrievin': Overtime Shift and Revenue Retrievin': Graveyard Shift were released in 2011.

The album has 18 tracks, along with 2 bonus tracks, and it features YG, Twista, T-Pain, Spice 1, Celly Cel, JT the Bigga Figga, C-Bo, Tech N9ne, Brotha Lynch Hung, Cellski, Andre Nickatina, T-Nutty and Suga-T among others. In addition, Butch Cassidy and Dorrough are featured on the two bonus tracks.

The album's first single is "Function", featuring YG, Iamsu! and Problem, released on February 17, 2012. It peaked at #1 on the Bubbling Under Hot 100 Singles chart and #62 on the Hot R&B/Hip-Hop Songs chart and #42 on the Rap Songs chart. The music video was released on March 6. A video for "Zombie" featuring Tech N9ne, Kung Fu Vampire & Brotha Lynch Hung was released on May 11, while one for "I'm Laced" was released July 6, 2012.

Two commercials were released in March 2012 to promote the Block Brochure album series. The second volume scored a 68/100 on Metacritic, indicating "generally positive reviews". It is the lowest of the three volumes.

Commercial performance
The volume debuted at #58 on the Billboard 200, and at #9 on the Hot R&B/Hip-hop albums chart. As of April 18, 2012, the album has sold 13,000 copies in US.

Track listing

Notes

 Cousin Fik is not credited in "I'm Laced" and "This Shit Hard"
 Stressmatic is not credited in "The Other Day Ago", "Sell Everything" and "Hittin' a Lick"
 Kung Fu Vampire has a cameo in the "Zombie" music video, but he was not involved in the production of the song.

Sample credits
"I'm Laced" - Contains a sample of "Ballaholic" by E-40

Charts

References

E-40 albums
2012 albums
Albums produced by T-Pain
Albums produced by Rick Rock
Albums produced by Droop-E
EMI Records albums
Sequel albums